Jamie de Courcey is an English actor. He has appeared in a number of British television shows, including The Crown, The Tunnel, Downton Abbey, Taboo, Agatha Christie's Poirot, and Midsomer Murders. He has also appeared in the films, Rush, directed by Ron Howard, Michael Morpurgo's Private Peaceful, and as Vincent van Gogh in Vincent Van Gogh: A New Way of Seeing and Sunflowers. He trained at the Royal Academy of Dramatic Art.

De Courcey lives in London and, since 2016, he has been in a relationship with actress Amara Karan.

He holds British and Irish citizenship.

Theatre

Film

Television

Short Film

References

English male stage actors
English male television actors
Alumni of RADA
Living people
Year of birth missing (living people)